Ian Robert Young, AO (born 17 January 1957) is an Australian academic. He is the Kernot Professor of Engineering at the University of Melbourne. He previously held the senior administrative roles of Vice-Chancellor of Swinburne University of Technology (2003–2011) and Vice-Chancellor of the Australian National University (2011–2016).

Young's field of research is Ocean Engineering and particularly the role of wind-generated ocean waves. His work has focused on the development of global wave prediction models, extreme wind and wave conditions, tropical cyclone generated waves, nearshore sea states and the role of global winds and waves in climate change.

Young is an Honorary Fellow of Engineers Australia, a Fellow of the Academy of Technological Sciences and Engineering, received the Centenary Medal "in recognition for his services to research" in 2000 and became an Officer in the General Division of the Order of Australia in 2012 for his "services to higher education and research". He was awarded the Lorenz G. Straub medal for research in Hydraulic Engineering in 1986, the National Medal for Education by the Vietnamese government in 2012 and has been ranked by Engineers Australia as one of Australia's top 100 Engineers. In 2017, he was awarded the Kevin Stark medal for excellence in Coastal and Ocean Engineering.

Education 
Young attended Pimlico State High School and then studied Civil Engineering at James Cook University. He completed three degrees at James Cook, graduating with BE(Hons) (1979), MEngSc (1982) and PhD (1984). His PhD study was focused on Ocean Engineering and particularly ocean surface waves.

Research and career 
Young was a postdoctoral research Fellow at the Max Planck Institute for Meteorology, Hamburg Germany (1983–1984), where he studied under Klaus Hasselmann. His post-doctoral work was focused on the use of ship radar to measure ocean waves, this work ultimately leading to the development of the WaMoS radar system.

Young returned to Australia in 1984 and took up a teaching and research role at the Australian Defence Force Academy, where he remained until 1998. During this period, he rose through the academic ranks to become a full Professor in 1994 and Rector of the institution in 1998. At this time, Young's research focused on the development of global numerical wave models, the development of nonlinear wave processes, shallow water waves and tropical cyclone wave models. His work on spectral wave models underpinned the development of today's global models such as WaveWatch. His field research at Lake George near Canberra pioneered understanding of the growth of waves in finite depth conditions and has become a standard approach for engineering design in such situations.

In 1999 he was appointed to the role of Executive Dean of the Faculty of Engineering, Computer and Mathematical Sciences at the University of Adelaide and subsequently became Pro Vice-Chancellor (International) in 2001. In 2003 he became the 2nd Vice-Chancellor of Swinburne University of Technology in Melbourne, where he served until 2011 when he became the 11th Vice-Chancellor of the Australian National University in Canberra. In 2016 he returned to Melbourne to take up the position of Kernot Professor of Engineer at the University of Melbourne.

Following 2010, Young's research has focused on the role of ocean wind and waves in climate and climate change. This work has largely been achieved by building long-term databases of satellite observations of the ocean from altimeter, radiometer and scatterometer instruments. A series of publications in this field have highlighted changes in global wind speed and wave height climates over the past 30 years and pioneered this field of research.

Administrative posts 
Young's term as Vice-Chancellor of Swinburne was marked by a transformation of the university from a largely teaching institution to one with high quality focused research activities. This sparked a rise in the university's place in international rankings, entering the top 500 universities in the world in 2010.

Young also transformed the Hawthorn campus of Swinburne through a multi-year capital development. He led a major redirection of Swinburne's education programs with the creation of Swinburne Online, an online services company, established through a joint venture partnership with Seek in 2011. During this same period, Young had a national role, representing Australia's universities as a Director of IDP Education, an international student recruitment company.

Young's period as Vice-Chancellor of the Australian National University was often controversial. Internally, Young set out to restructure the finances and administrative structures of the institution, a process which required financial restraint and a voluntary early retirement scheme in 2014. Externally, Young became Chair of the Group of Eight in 2014, a time when the Australian Government proposed the deregulation of Australia's university system. The Group of Eight became a strong supporter of this policy and hence Young was a public advocate. Ultimately, the controversial proposal was unable to pass the Australian Senate and hence did not come into effect.

Young also expanded philanthropy at ANU and in 2012, alumnus Graham Tuckwell donated AUD 50 million to the university, this amount increasing to AUD 100 million in 2016. At the time, this was the largest philanthropic donation ever received by an Australian university. When Young retired from ANU in 2016, the university was ranked 19 in the world, the highest ranking ever achieved by an Australian university and he had put in place a major capital program to transform the built infrastructure of the ANU campus.

Business activities 
Outside of his university research roles, Young is also involved in business activities. He is the President and CEO of Conviro, President of CloudCampus and Director of VERNet. He is also the Director of International Centre for Democratic Partnerships, a member of the Questacon Advisory Council and Chair Advisory Board of Cluey.

Awards and honors 
1986 - Lorenz G. Straub medal for research in Hydraulic Engineering
1998 - Fellow of the Institution of Engineers of Australia
2001 - Fellow of the Australian Academy of Technological Sciences and Engineering
2000 - Centenary Medal, Australian Government
2011 - Honorary Fellow, Engineers Australia 
2012 - National Medal for Education by the Vietnamese Government
2014 - Officer of the Order of Australia, AO
2017 - Keven Stark medal for excellence in Coast and Ocean Engineering

Selected publications 
Young, I.R., Rosenthal, W. and Ziemer, F., 1985, "A Three-Dimensional Analysis of  Marine Radar  Images for the Determination  of  Ocean  Wave Directionality  and Surface Currents", Journal of Geophysical Research,  Vol. 90, No. C1, 1049–1060.
Young, I.R., Hasselmann, S. and Hasselmann, K., 1987, "Computations of the response of a wave spectrum to a sudden  change  in  wind  direction", Jnl. Physical Oceanography, Vol. 17, No.9, 1317–1338.
Young, I.R. and van Vledder, G.Ph., 1993, "A Review of the Central Role of Nonlinear Interactions in Wind-Wave Evolution", Phil. Trans. Roy. Soc. Lond. A, 342, 505–524.
Young, I.R. and Verhagen, L.A., 1996, "The Growth of Fetch Limited Waves in Water of Finite Depth. Part I: Total Energy and Peak Frequency", Coastal Engineering, 28, 47–78.
Young, I.R. and Burchell, G.P., 1996, "Hurricane Generated Waves as Observed by Satellite", Ocean Engineering, 23, 8, 761–776.
Young, I.R. and Verhagen, L.A., 1996, "The Growth of Fetch Limited Waves in Water of Finite Depth. Part I: Total Energy and Peak Frequency", Coastal Engineering, 28, 47–78.
Young, I.R., Zieger, S. and Babanin, A.V., 2011, "Global trends in wind speed and wave height", Science, 332, 451–455.
Young, I.R. and Ribal, A., 2019, "Multi-platform evaluation of global trends in wind speed and wave height", Science, 364, 548–552.
Ribal, A. and Young, I.R., 2019, "33 years of globally calibrated wave height and wind speed data based on altimeter observations", Sci. Data, 6, 77.

References 

James Cook University alumni
Australian engineers
Living people
Recipients of the Centenary Medal
Academic staff of the University of Melbourne
Officers of the Order of Australia
1957 births